Red Banks is an unincorporated community located in Robeson County, North Carolina, United States.

Notes

Unincorporated communities in Robeson County, North Carolina
Unincorporated communities in North Carolina